Coming Attractions may refer to:

 Coming Attractions (book), a 1957 anthology of science fiction essays edited by Martin Greenberg
 Coming Attractions (album), a 2000 album by Adrian Belew
 Previews of coming attractions or trailers
 "Coming Attractions", a song by the Vels from Velocity

See also
 "Coming Attraction", a 1950 science fiction short story by Fritz Leiber